Vakulenko is a Ukrainian surname. Notable people with the surname include:

Julia Vakulenko (born 1983), Ukraine-born tennis player
Oleksiy Vakulenko (1981–2007), Ukrainian Greco-Roman wrestler
Serhiy Vakulenko (born 1993), Ukrainian footballer
Vasiliy Vakulenko (Basta) (born 1980), Russian rapper, producer and radio host
Volodymyr Vakulenko (1972–2022), Ukrainian children writer and poet

See also
 

Ukrainian-language surnames